The 1880 Invercargill mayoral election was held on 24 November 1880.

Nicholas Johnson defeated former mayor Joseph Hatch and councillor John Kingsland.

Results
The following table gives the election results:

References

1880 elections in New Zealand
Mayoral elections in Invercargill